This is a list of Rwandan writers.

See also
List of African writers by country
List of Rwandans

References

Rwandan
Writers